A spar is a marine structure, used for floating oil/gas platforms. Named after navigation channel Spar buoys, spar platforms were developed as an extreme deepwater alternative to conventional platforms. The deep draft design of spars makes them less affected by wind, wave, and currents and allows for both dry tree and subsea production.

A spar platform consists of a large-diameter, vertical buoyant cylinder(s) supporting a deck. Spars are permanently anchored to the seabed by way of a spread mooring system composed of either a chain-wire-chain or chain-polyester-chain configuration. The cylinder comprises a number of tanks, the lowest contains ballast, mid-water and/or extracted oil, the upper, air for buoyancy. Helical strakes are fitted to the larger & more recent designs to mitigate the effects of vortex-induced motion. 

There are three primary types of spars; classic, truss, and cell.  

A classic spar consists of a tall-height, cylindrical hull, with tanks for heavy ballast located at the bottom of the cylinder.

A truss spar comprises 3 parts, a short-height, large-diameter cylindrical hull, atop a truss structure, atop tanks for heavy ballast.

A cell spar consists of a cluster of small-diameter cylinders and relatively speaking, extremely cheap to manufacture.  
Cylinders are either; buoyancy only, or subdivided into buoyancy & ballast. 

The first spar platform was the Brent Spar. Designed for storage and offloading of crude oil products, it was installed on the UK's Brent Field in June 1976. Shell's attempted deep sea disposal of the platform in the 1990s created a massive environmental backlash by Greenpeace. The spar was eventually dismantled, with ballast used as a foundation for a quay in Norway.

The first spar platform designed for production was the Neptune spar, located in the Gulf of Mexico, and was installed in September 1996 by Kerr McGee.

The first cell-spar platform was Kerr-McGee's Red Hawk spar, (7 of 8m diameter cells). Cell-spar implementation has to date only ever used for one platform. Field-depletion occurred 4 years after production started, Red Hawk was decommissioned in 2014 under the Bureau of Safety and Environmental Enforcement's "Rigs-to-Reefs" program,  at which time it was the deepest floating platform to be decommissioned.

The world's deepest production platform is Perdido, a truss spar in the Gulf of Mexico, with a mean water depth of 2,438 meters. It is operated by Royal Dutch Shell and was built at a cost of $3 billion.

References

External links 

 GlobalSecurity.org page on spar platforms - containing detailed diagrams

Oil platforms
Offshore engineering